Lee Min-gyu (Hangul: 이민규, born 3 December 1992) is a volleyball player from South Korea. He currently plays as a setter for the Ansan OK Savings Bank. Lee made his first appearance for the South Korean national team in 2012 and played all of the team's six matches at the 2012 Asian Men's Cup Volleyball Championship, where the team finished in fifth place. In 2013, he also completed in the Summer Universiade as a member of the collegiate national team. Since the 2013 FIVB World League, Lee has been a regular member of the South Korean national team.

References

External links
 Lee Min-gyu profile at 2013 Summer Universiade
 Lee Min-gyu profile at 2014 World Championship
 profile at FIVB.org

1992 births
Living people
South Korean men's volleyball players
Asian Games medalists in volleyball
Volleyball players at the 2014 Asian Games
Volleyball players at the 2018 Asian Games
Kyonggi University alumni
Place of birth missing (living people)
Asian Games silver medalists for South Korea
Asian Games bronze medalists for South Korea
Medalists at the 2014 Asian Games
Medalists at the 2018 Asian Games
People from Bucheon
Sportspeople from Gyeonggi Province
21st-century South Korean people